NH 26 may refer to:

 National Highway 26 (India)
 New Hampshire Route 26, United States